Charles A. Anderson may refer to:

 Charles Alexander Anderson (1857–1940), British Army general 
 Charles Arthur Anderson (1899–1977), politician
 Charles Alfred Anderson (1902–1990), American geologist
 Charles Anderson (businessman) (1917–2009), businessman and CEO of SRI International from 1968 to 1980

See also
Charles Anderson (disambiguation)